Galtara laportei is a moth of the subfamily Arctiinae. It was described by Hervé de Toulgoët in 1979. It is found in Rwanda.

References

 

Nyctemerina
Moths described in 1979